Mark James Cusack (born July 3, 1984) is the State Representative of Massachusetts from the 5th Norfolk District. Serving his sixth term in that capacity. Representative Cusack is a democrat from Braintree, Massachusetts. The 5th Norfolk District encompasses all precincts in the town of Braintree, Precinct 1 in the town of Holbrook and Precinct 4 in the town of Randolph. Currently, he serves as the Chairman of the Joint Committee on Revenue. He had previously served as the assistant to Braintree Mayor Joe Sullivan. He was sworn in on January 5, 2011.

Public life
Mark is the State Representative of Massachusetts from the 5th Norfolk District, representing the town of Braintree and Holbrook (precinct 1), and Randolph (precinct 4). He graduated from Braintree High School in 2003 and University of Massachusetts Amherst in 2007 with a B.A. in Political Science. He interned for Congressman Stephen Lynch. He then became the Assistant to the Braintree Mayor in 2007.

In 2011, Mark was sworn into the Massachusetts House of Representatives, he was re-elected to his seat for his sixth term in 2021.

Mark is the Chairman for the Joint Committee on Revenue for the second straight legislative session (2019–Present). He previously served as the Chairman for the Joint Committee on Marijuana Policy for the 190th Session (2017–18), the Chairman for the Committee on Technology and Intergovernmental Affairs for the 189th Session (2015–16) and Vice Chair for the Joint Committee on Telecommunications, Utilities, and Energy for the 188th Session (2013–14).

Additionally, Mark served as a Commissioner as appointed by then-House Speaker Robert DeLeo on the Online Gaming, Fantasy Sports Gaming and Daily Fantasy Sports Commission. Rep. Cusack currently serves on the Tax Expenditure Review Commission.

Marijuana Policy Committee 
On November 8, 2016 during the Presidential Election voters of Massachusetts were able to vote on a ballot initiative (Question 4) to legalize adult-use marijuana in the Commonwealth of Massachusetts. The question passed by a percentage of 53.7% Yes to 46.3% No. An extension was then passed by the legislature and the Governor in order for the legislature to review the current law as it stood. The task was to create a law that maintained the will of the voters, while making sure there were the correct consumer protection, public safety, and economic equality in the industry of marijuana. This task was given to the newly created Joint Committee on Marijuana Policy.

Rep. Cusack was appointed Chairman for the Joint Committee on Marijuana Policy by Speaker Robert Deleo at the beginning of the 190th Session of the Massachusetts General Court (2016–18). The committee held five hearings throughout a  three month period to hear from elected officials, experts in the industry, law enforcement, veterans, concerned constituents, patients, and many other individuals whom testified with information pertaining to legalizing adult-use marijuana. The Committee did not reach a consensus bill between the House of Representatives and Senate, therefore two separate bills were passed in June 2016.  The House bill was "an act to ensure the public health and safety of patient and consumer access to medical and adult use of marijuana in the Commonwealth" (House, No. 3776), and the Senate amendment to that bill was Senate No. 2097. A Conference Committee was appointed, whereas Rep. Cusack was one of the three members of the House of Representatives, in hopes to come to an agreement on a consensus bill. A consensus bill was signed by all conferees (6-0) in favor to pass and "An act to safe access to marijuana" (House No. 3818) was signed by Governor Charlie Baker on July 28, 2017.

Special Commission on Online Gaming, Fantasy Sports Gaming and Daily Fantasy Sports 
A special commission on online gaming, fantasy sports gaming and daily fantasy sports was created through the Economic Development Bill signed by Gov. Baker in 2016. This commission has nine commissioners appointed including the two co-chairs. Rep. Cusack was the appointment of Speaker Deleo to represent the leadership within the House of Representatives along with the Co-Chair.  The commission's directive entailed a comprehensive study of the regulations surrounding daily fantasy sports and online gaming, which was officially legitimatized by Attorney General Maura Healey through the AGO's final regulations in January, 2016. Meetings of the special commission took place throughout 2016-17, totaling eight, where the commissioners listened to testimony from experts in gaming, esports, daily fantasy sports, the attorney general's office, casinos, and other fields relating to online gaming in Massachusetts.

The special commission met on July 25, 2017 to finalize a report that was to be sent to the legislature for suggestions on how to proceed with online gaming and daily fantasy sports. Some disagreement ensued and the meeting was recessed until July 31, 2017 (the deadline for a report), On July 31, 2017 a final report was given to the commissioners for a vote in order to allow the report to be sent as is to the legislature. In a vote of 5-3 with one commissioner abstaining, the report was sent out of the special commission to the legislature. Rep. Cusack dissented to the report for multiple reasons, one of those reasons was defining daily fantasy sports as "online gaming". Another was the negative impact that this definition will have on investors for the DFS companies and the ultimate repercussions that will come to Massachusetts in the loss of innovative businesses.

See also
 2019–2020 Massachusetts legislature
 2021–2022 Massachusetts legislature

References

External links
Biography of State Rep. Mark Cusack at Mass.gov
Mark J. Cusack for State Rep

1984 births
Living people
Democratic Party members of the Massachusetts House of Representatives
Politicians from Braintree, Massachusetts
University of Massachusetts Amherst College of Social and Behavioral Sciences alumni
21st-century American politicians
Braintree High School alumni